Michel Magne (20 March 1930 in Lisieux, Calvados, France – 19 December 1984 in Cergy-Pontoise, Val-d'Oise) was a French film and experimental music composer.

Early life 
He was the fifth child in a family of eight. As young as age five, he was intrigued by his parents' piano. The Lisieux cathedral's organist taught him to play keyboards, and soon he played the harmonium during Sunday services. At age nine he found his parents' Wagner discs, and thereafter would often quote Wagner in his works.

By age 16 he had written an oratorio and a piano concerto. In 1946, he left Caen to attend the Paris Conservatory, where he had lessons by Simone Plé-Caussade and Olivier Messiaen.

Achievements, career, recording studio 
He was nominated in 1962 for an Academy Award and Golden Globe Award for adapting the Jackie Gleason score to film Gigot. He also scored Barbarella and a series of OSS 117 films.

In 1962, he released the studio album Tropical Fantasy.

Magne wrote some songs with lyrics by Françoise Sagan for Juliette Gréco and provided orchestral accompaniment.

In 1962, he purchased the Château d'Hérouville, near Pontoise, and converted it into a residential recording studio in 1969, known as Studio d'enregistrement Michel Magne, which through the 1970s was used by a series of artists such as Elton John (at his Honky Château), Pink Floyd, David Bowie, Jethro Tull, Cat Stevens, and the Bee Gees among many others.

In the 1970s, Jean-Claude Petit scored Magne's films, without due credit.

Personal life and death 
In 1972, he married Marie-Claude, having met her in 1970, near Hérouville while she was hitch-hiking as a schoolgirl. The couple moved to the south of France in 1974.

Magne committed suicide in 1984, in a hotel room.

Film scores
 1955
 Le Pain vivant
 1960
 Détournement de mineures
 Les Sérum de bonté (TV series)
 Les Filles sèment le vent
 1961
 Les Livreurs
 Les Laches vivent d'espoir
 Rodophe Bresdin
 1962
 Gigot (arranged and conducted only)
 Le Diable et les Dix Commandements
 Le Repos du guerrier
 Les filles de La Rochelle
 Konga Yo
 Un singe en hiver
 Les Bricoleurs
 Le Gorille a mordu l'archevêque
 1963
 Les Tontons flingueurs
 Germinal
 Les Grands Chemins
 Symphonie pour un massacre
 Les Femmes d'abord
 Le Vice et la vertu
 Des frissons partout
 Méfiez-vous, mesdames
 OSS 117 se déchaîne
 Tante Aurore viendra ce soir
 Mélodie en sous-sol
 1964
 Angélique, Marquise des Anges
 Les Barbouzes
 Fantômas
 La Ronde
 Cyrano et d'Artagnan
 La chasse à l'homme
 Le Monocle rit jaune
 Banco à Bangkok pour OSS 117
 Le Gentleman de Cocody
 Les Gros bras
 1965
 Fantômas se déchaîne
 Les Bons Vivants
 Coplan FX 18 casse tout
 Mission spéciale à Caracas
 Par un beau matin d'été
 Furia à Bahia pour OSS 117
 A Woman in White 
 Marvelous Angelique 
 La Bonne Occase
 Compartiment tueurs
 1966
 Atout cœur à Tokyo pour OSS 117
 To Skin a Spy
 Brigade antigangs
 Angelique and the King
 
 Estouffade à la Caraïbe
 1967
  Untamable Angelique 
 Johnny Banco
 À cœur joie
 Un homme de trop
 Fantômas contre Scotland Yard
 Batouk
 1968
 The Sergeant
 Sous le signe de Monte-Cristo
 Le Bâtard (musical direction)
 Barbarella (musical direction)
 Angelique and the Sultan
 
 
 1969
 Les Étrangers
 1970
 Cold Sweat
 Cran d'arrêt
 1972
 Tout le monde il est beau, tout le monde il est gentil
 1973
 Le Complot
 Don Juan ou Si Don Juan était une femme... de Roger Vadim (orchestration)
 Moi y'en a vouloir des sous
 1974
 Les Chinois à Paris
 1976
 Néa
 1978
 Viol
 1982
 Les Misérables
 T'es folle ou quoi?
 1983
 S.A.S. à San Salvador
 Surprise Party
 L'indic
 1984 Réveillon chez Bob Emmanuelle 4''

References

External links
[French] Michel Magne, un destin foudroyé, Daniel Bastié, Ed. Grand Angle, 2014
Michel Magne, Space Age Pop
, Magne biography in English
 

1930 births
1984 deaths
People from Lisieux
French film score composers
French male film score composers
20th-century French composers
Drug-related suicides in France
20th-century French male musicians
1984 suicides